The following is a list of Teen Choice Award winners and nominees for Choice Music – Country Song. In 2011, it was given out as Choice Music – Country Track but went back to its original title. Taylor Swift is the most awarded artist in this category with four wins.

Winners and nominees

2010s

Winning Records
Taylor Swift has won the most times in this category, with four consecutive wins. Blake Shelton and Luke Bryan have each received over five nominations in the category.

References

Country music awards
Country Song